Davudabad (also Romanized as Dāvūdābād) is a village in Valiabad Rural District of the Central District of Qarchak County, Tehran province, Iran. At the 2006 National Census, its population was 7,435 in 1,753 households, when it was in the former Qarchak District of Varamin County. The following census in 2011 counted 7,323 people in 1,911 households. The latest census in 2016 showed a population of 6,399 people in 1,846 households, by which time the district had been separated from the county and Qarchak County established; it was the largest village in its rural district.

References 

Qarchak County

Populated places in Tehran Province

Populated places in Qarchak County